In dual decomposition a problem is broken into smaller subproblems and a solution to the relaxed problem is found. This method can be employed for MRF optimization. Dual decomposition is applied to markov logic programs as an inference technique.

Background 
Discrete MRF Optimization (inference) is very important in Machine Learning and Computer vision, which is realized on CUDA graphical processing units. Consider a graph with nodes and Edges . The goal is to assign a label to each so that the MRF Energy is minimized:

(1)  

Major MRF Optimization methods are based on Graph cuts or Message passing. They rely on the following integer linear programming formulation

(2)  

Dual Decomposition 

The main idea behind decomposition is surprisingly simple:

 decompose your original complex problem into smaller solvable subproblems,
 extract a solution by cleverly combining the solutions from these subproblems.

A sample problem to decompose:

where 

So the problem needs to get decomposed using auxiliary variables  and the problem will be as follows:

where 

Now we can relax the constraints by multipliers  which gives us the following Lagrangian dual function:

We can set up a Lagrangian dual problem:

(3)   The Master problem

(4)  where The Slave problems

MRF optimization via Dual Decomposition 

The original MRF optimization problem is NP-hard and we need to transform it into something easier.

is a set of sub-trees of graph where its trees cover all nodes and edges of the main graph. And MRFs defined for every tree  in will be smaller. For all vectors we'll have the following:

(5)  

Where and denote all trees of than contain node and edge respectively. We simply can write:

(6)  

And our constraints will be:

(7)  

Our original MRF problem will become:

(8)  where and 

And we'll have the dual problem we were seeking:

(9)  The Master problem

where each function is defined as:

(10)  where The Slave problems

Theoretical Properties 
Theorem 1. Lagrangian relaxation (9) is equivalent to the LP relaxation of (2).

Theorem 2. If the sequence of multipliers satisfies then the algorithm converges to the optimal solution of (9).

Theorem 3. The distance of the current solution to the optimal solution , which decreases at every iteration.

Theorem 4. Any solution obtained by the method satisfies the WTA (weak tree agreement) condition.

Theorem 5. For binary MRFs with sub-modular energies, the method computes a globally optimal solution.

References 

Markov models